Nanasaheb Dharmadhikari (Dr. Shree Narayan Vishnu Dharmadhikari) (1 March 1922 – 8 July 2008) was an Indian spiritual Guru cum Social Reformer who initiated a free social service of spiritual literature from first place of Revdanda in Raigad district, India.

The intention behind his literary work was to put the broken society in strong unified position through elimination of orthodox customs and traditions.

Dr Nanasaheb Dharmadhikari started his work with 5 followers. Initially they took their followers on a pilgrimage of top holy locations throughout country.

They closely observed at all holy locations and realized that they hold no capability to clean peoples sins  these places are now cluttered with sins.

After pilgrimage he founded an organization named Shree Samarth Prasadik Aadhyatmic Seva Samiti and spent his entire life spreading the philosophy of the saint Samarth Ramdas, writer of the devotional books Dasbodh, Manache Shlok, and Atmaram. Dharmadhikari had millions of followers across the world. He was also awarded by many government and social organizations for his work. In 2008, the Government of Maharashtra conferred upon him the Maharashtra Bhushan Award, which is highest civilian award being given by Government of Maharashtra.
Dr. Nanasaheb Dharmadhikari was born to a family having original surname as Shandilya, in their lineage.
Nearly 350 years ago, his ancestors were rewarded for their social reforming work with new title named Dharmadhikari (Authority of Dharma); by the navy chief Sarkhel Kanhoji Angre who was ruling Konkan Coast at that time, {Kanhoji Angre (August 1669 – 4 July 1729) was the chief of the Maratha Navy in 18th century India, Sarkhel is a title equal to Admiral of a fleet}. 
Dr Nanasaheb Dharmadhikari got the inspiration from a scripture named Shrimat Daasbodh(or just Dasbodh), which he had studied since childhood.
After several years, he started an uncommon social reform  service on 8 October 1943, on the event of Vijayadashami i.e. commonly known as Dussehra.
In this social reform service he started giving spiritual or inspirational speeches (often called Nirupan) on all lessons of Dasbodh weekly, one by one. 
Initially there were only seven people attending to hear the speech, but as years passed on, more and more people started to join in, making it a vast family of 10 millions.
Today, such service (also called Shri Baithak(श्रीबैठक)) is present in multiple Nations such as UAE, London, Singapore, Australia, Nigeria, Iran and so on.
At the Initial stage, Dr Nanasaheb had to walk longer distances, some as long as 70 km so as to reach spot where speech on Dasbodh is to be provided, he gave the speech to people, whether one was present or thousand.
He was always helpful in solving people's issues through correct guidance, resolving superstitious thoughts, literally through speech.

References
http://www.shreedarshan.com/saint-sadguru-nanasaheb_dharmadhikari.htm#top

http://www.dsndp.com/Index.html

People from Raigad
1922 births
2008 deaths
Recipients of the Maharashtra Bhushan Award
Marathi people